Wu Jiani (born 23 April 1966) is a former female Chinese gymnast. Wu was born in Shanghai. She started gymnastic training in 1973, and was admitted into Shanghai gymnastic team in 1976, and Chinese national team in 1977.

Wu competed at 1984 Olympic Games, and won a bronze medal in Women's Team competition. She qualified to the all-around, uneven bars and balance beam finals, but had to withdraw from all of them due to dislocating her elbow after the team competition. She was a five-time Chinese National Champion and a World Championship bronze medalist on beam in 1981.

Wu Jiani Salto is a skill of uneven bars with C value.  This skill was banned due to the development of the apparatus.

Her husband is Li Yuejiu, also a famed gymnast and an Olympic medalist. One of their daughters is Anna Li, who competed for the UCLA Bruins gymnastics team during the 2007 through 2010 seasons and at the same Pauley Pavilion where her parents won the Olympic medals. Following the Visa Championships and two selection camps at the Karolyi Ranch in New Waverly, Texas, Anna Li was named to the gold medal winning U.S. 2011 World Championship Team. An injury kept her from competing. In 2012, she was named an alternate to the 2012 Olympic Games.

Andrea Li, the youngest daughter who is also a gymnast for junior competitions such as Nastia Liukin  Cup and Junior Olympic Championships.

Along with their daughter, Wu and Li have been the coaches for several elite athletes, including the Caquatto sisters: World Silver Medalist Mackenzie Caquatto and Pan American Games triple Gold Medalist Bridgette Caquatto. In April 2009, they opened Legacy Elite Gymnastics in Aurora, Illinois together to train local gymnasts.

References

External links 
 
 
 

1966 births
Living people
Chinese female artistic gymnasts
Olympic bronze medalists for China
Olympic medalists in gymnastics
Gymnasts from Shanghai
Asian Games medalists in gymnastics
Gymnasts at the 1982 Asian Games
Medalists at the 1984 Summer Olympics
Medalists at the World Artistic Gymnastics Championships
Asian Games gold medalists for China
Asian Games silver medalists for China
Medalists at the 1982 Asian Games
Olympic gymnasts of China
Gymnasts at the 1984 Summer Olympics